Saint  Sanctain or Sanctan was a 6th-century Manx bishop, who originally came from Northern Britain.

Sanctan was the son of Sawyl Penuchel, a king in Northern Britain. He is said to have been a brother of Saint Patrick, though this is chronologically impossible. He was an active missionary in Cumbria, before becoming Bishop of the unidentified Cell da les (or 'church of the two forts'). This may be Kill-na-Sanctan near  Dublin or on the Isle of Man, where the civil parish of Santon is named after him. His feast day is on 20 May.

References
 A Manx Notebook: Parish of Kirk Santan
 A Manx Notebook: Stained glass window from St John's church
Omnium Sanctorum Hiberniae 2012-2015

6th-century Christian saints
Manx saints
Northern Brythonic saints
Medieval Irish saints
Manx religious leaders
Christian missionaries in England
Manx Christian missionaries
Christian missionaries in the Isle of Man